Stephen James Irons (born 1 September 1958) is an Australian politician. He was the Liberal member of the Australian House of Representatives representing the electoral Division of Swan in Western Australia from the 2007 federal election to his retirement at the 2022 federal election.

Early life 
Irons was raised in the Melbourne suburb of Box Hill North. Irons was the sixth of ten children in the Dix family; and when he was six months old he was placed into an orphanage in Camberwell. Irons was fostered at age three by the Irons family who had recently migrated from South Africa. Irons' foster father was a church minister in South Africa and a social worker within mostly State and Local Council organisations in Victoria, and his foster mother worked as a social worker within medical institutions and Charity organisations in Melbourne. Irons grew up with his foster family until moving to Perth. Irons completed an apprenticeship as an electrician after completing his high school education in Melbourne.

Irons moved to Perth in 1981 to play Australian Rules Football for East Perth in the West Australian Football League. He began working at an air conditioning company located in Lord St East Perth, while playing for East Perth. In 1996, he became the owner of the company.

Parliamentary career 
Irons was the only Liberal in Australia to defeat a sitting Labor MP at the 2007 election, defeating Kim Wilkie by a margin of 0.19 percent on a two-party-preferred basis.

Since his election in 2007, Irons has sat on a large number of Parliamentary Committees and was a member of the Speaker's panel from 2015 until 2018.

Following the election of Scott Morrison as Liberal Leader and thus Prime Minister of Australia, Irons was elevated to the Ministry as Assistant Minister to the Prime Minister in August 2018.

While campaigning for the 2019 election, Irons was approached outside his electorate office and asked how many times he voted to cut penalty rates. Irons confronted the Unionists, who had allegedly sworn at his wife, saying that with regards to a bill that was introduced to Parliament for mandatory sentencing of convicted sex offenders that unlike the Labor party he did not vote for "paedophiles, sex offenders and rapists" against the bill.

Following the 2019 election, Irons was sworn in as the assistant minister for vocational education, training and apprenticeships.

Irons pulled out of the preselection process for the seat of Swan prior to the 2022 Australian federal election. Sky News commentator Kristy McSweeney was endorsed as the Liberal party candidate for his seat, unopposed. The move by the Liberal party to not restart the preselection process when Irons pulled out was criticised by other preselection hopefuls, who would have run for preselection had Irons pulled out earlier.

Issues 
Irons is a member of the centre-right faction of the Liberal Party.

In his maiden speech to Parliament, Irons noted that he wanted a national focus on the forgotten Australians and former child migrants, and on forced adoption. He worked with both sides of the house in the national apology to Forgotten Australians and Former Child Migrants on 16 November 2009, and on the National Apology for forced adoptions. Irons was among the first to call for a royal commission into institutional child sexual abuse. In 2018 Irons called for the introduction of the death penalty for paedophiles and "people who continually abuse children".

Personal life 
His son Jarrad Irons played Australian rules football for Port Adelaide in the Australian Football League.

On 21 October 2011, Irons married Cheryle Street, then a Melbourne-based real estate agent.

In October 2015, Irons pleaded guilty to a case of driving with a blood alcohol reading of 0.069. He was served with a good behaviour order.

In December 2015, Irons billed the taxpayers for him to attend an amateur golf tournament at the Gold Coast even though his electorate is in Western Australia. His wife also attended the tournament, which was also billed to the taxpayer to the value of around $4000. Irons denied any wrongdoing.

In 2016, 5 years after the event, the media revealed that Irons charged his wedding flight to the taxpayers in 2011. Irons paid the charge back in early 2013.

See also
Forgotten Australians
Royal Commission into Institutional Responses to Child Sexual Abuse

References

External links
 

1958 births
Australian rules footballers from Western Australia
East Perth Football Club players
Liberal Party of Australia members of the Parliament of Australia
Living people
Members of the Australian House of Representatives
Members of the Australian House of Representatives for Swan
21st-century Australian politicians
Morrison Government
People educated at Blackburn High School
People from Box Hill, Victoria
Australian rules footballers from Melbourne